Thomas Sebastián Ortega (born 6 December 2000) is an Argentine professional footballer who plays as a left-back for Club Atlético Independiente after he his tenure on Instituto de Córdoba.

Professional career
On 8 January 2020, Ortega signed his first professional contract with Independiente. Ortega made his professional debut with Independiente in a 1-0 Argentine Primera División loss to Racing Club on 9 February 2020. In June 2022, Ortega joined Primera Nacional side Instituto on loan for the rest of 2023 with a purchase option.

References

External links
 
 Indepentiente Profile

 

2000 births
Living people
People from Almirante Brown Partido
Argentine footballers
Association football defenders
Club Atlético Independiente footballers
Instituto footballers
Argentine Primera División players
Sportspeople from Buenos Aires Province